Neli A'asa (born February 16, 1988) is a  former American football player who played college football at the University of Utah.

High school
Neli attended Big Rapids High School in Big Rapids, Michigan. As a junior, he had 67 tackles, eight sacks, three fumble recoveries, and two forced fumbles. He was a three-star recruit and was recruited by Utah, Boise State, BYU, Colorado, Michigan State, UNLV, and USC.

College
Neli lettered all four years. He played tight end in 2008, offensive line in 2009, and defensive tackle in 2010.

Professional career
In 2011, A'asa was signed by the Utah Blaze of the Arena Football League.  A'asa tried out for multiple NFL teams. Although receiving much interest, A'asa was never able to find a spot on the active NFL roster due to injuries. He was suspended by the league for the 2012 season.

References

External links
 NFL Draft Scouting Report

1988 births
Living people
Utah Blaze players
Utah Utes football players
People from Big Rapids, Michigan
Players of American football from Michigan